Boiga bourreti is a species of snake in the family Colubridae. The species is endemic to Southeast Asia.

Etymology
The specific name, bourreti, is in honor of French herpetologist René Léon Bourret.

Geographic range
B. bourreti is found in central Vietnam.

Habitat

Behavior
B. bourreti is nocturnal.

Diet
B. bourreti preys upon small vertebrates.

Reproduction
B. bourreti is oviparous.

References

Further reading
Nguyen SV, Ho CT, Nguyen TQ (2009). Herpetofauna of Vietnam. Frankfurt am Main: Chimaira / Serpents Tale. 768 pp. .
Tillack F, Ziegler T, Le Khac Quyet (2004). "Eine neue Art der Gattung Boiga Fitzinger, 1826 (Serpentes: Colubridae: Colubrinae) aus dem zentralen Vietnam ". Sauria 26 (4): 3–13. (Boiga bourreti, new species). (in German).

Reptiles described in 2004
Reptiles of Vietnam
bourreti
Snakes of Vietnam
Snakes of Asia